This is a list of trolleybus systems in Italy by Regione.  It includes all trolleybus systems, past and present.

Italian peninsula

Abruzzo

Campania

Emilia-Romagna

Friuli-Venezia Giulia

Lazio

Liguria

Lombardy

Military line:

Marche

Piedmont

Apulia

Tuscany

Umbria

Aosta Valley

Veneto

Military lines:

Sardinia

Sicily

See also

 List of trolleybus systems, for all other countries
 Trolleybus usage by country
 List of town tramway systems in Italy
 List of light-rail transit systems
 List of rapid transit systems

Sources

Books and periodicals
 Bruce, Ashley R. Lombard-Gerin and Inventing the Trolleybus. (2017) Trolleybooks (UK).  
 Murray, Alan (2000). World Trolleybus Encyclopaedia. Reading, Berkshire, UK: Trolleybooks.
 Gregoris, Paolo; Rizzoli, Francesco; & Serra, Claudio (2003). Giro d'Italia in filobus. Cortona: Editore Calosci.
 Peschkes, Robert (1993). World Gazetteer of Tram, Trolleybus and Rapid Transit Systems, Part Three: Europe. London: Rapid Transit Publications.
 Trolleybus Magazine (ISSN 0266-7452). National Trolleybus Association (UK). Bimonthly.

References

External links

Italy